Harry "Sweets" Edison (October 10, 1915 – July 27, 1999) was an American jazz trumpeter and a member of the Count Basie Orchestra. His most important contribution was as  a Hollywood studio musician, whose muted trumpet can be heard backing singers, most notably Frank Sinatra.

Biography
Edison was born in Columbus, Ohio, United States. He spent his early childhood in Louisville, Kentucky, being introduced to music by an uncle. After moving back to Columbus at the age of twelve, the young Edison began playing the trumpet with local bands.

In 1933, he became a member of the Jeter-Pillars Orchestra in Cleveland. Afterwards, he played with the Mills Blue Rhythm Band and Lucky Millinder. In 1937, he moved to New York and joined the Count Basie Orchestra. His colleagues included Buck Clayton, Lester Young (who named him "Sweets"), Buddy Tate, Freddie Green, Jo Jones, and other original members of that famous band. Speaking in 1956 with Down Beat's Don Freeman, Edison explained the origin of his nickname:
Well, this happened one day in March back in '37. All of us in the Basie band were sitting around the lobby of the Woodside Hotel in New York. It was snowing outside, and we were waiting for the bus to go on a tour of one-nighters. We were all like brothers in that band. I was kind of the baby of the band and took a lot of the ribbing. So this time Lester Young was joshing me about my 'sweet' style and he said: "We're going to call you 'Sweetie Pie.'" They did, too, for a few months. Then they shortened it to "Sweets." The nickname has kind of lasted a long time.

"Sweets" Edison came to prominence as a soloist with the Basie Band and as an occasional composer/arranger for the band. He also appeared in the 1944 film Jammin' the Blues.

Edison spent thirteen years with Basie until the band was temporarily disbanded in 1950. Edison thereafter pursued a varied career as leader of his own groups, traveling with Jazz at the Philharmonic and freelancing with other orchestras. In the early 1950s, he settled on the West Coast and became a highly sought-after studio musician, making important contributions to recordings by such artists as Billie Holiday, Frank Sinatra, Nat King Cole, Billy Daniels, Margaret Whiting, Bing Crosby and Ella Fitzgerald. He worked closely with the arranger Nelson Riddle, who gave Edison a microphone that was separate from the rest of the trumpet section. He made use of a Harmon mute to improvise his solos and obbligatos. In 1956, he recorded the first of three albums with Ben Webster.

According to the Encyclopedia of Jazz in the Seventies, Edison in the 1960s and 1970s continued to work in many orchestras on television shows, including Hollywood Palace and The Leslie Uggams Show, specials with Frank Sinatra; prominently featured on the sound track and in the sound track album of the film, Lady Sings the Blues. From 1973, Edison acted as Musical Director for Redd Foxx on theatre dates, at concerts, and in Las Vegas. He appeared frequently in Europe and Japan until shortly before his death. As the Los Angeles Jazz Society (LAJS) first Tribute Honoree, "Sweets" will always have a special place in the hearts of jazz fans.

Edison died of prostate cancer at his home in Columbus, Ohio at the age of 83.

Discography

As leader/co-leader
 Buddy and Sweets (Norgran, 1955) with Buddy Rich
 Pres and Sweets (Norgran, 1955) with Lester Young
 Sweets (Clef, 1956)
 Gee, Baby Ain't I Good to You (Verve, 1957) with Ben Webster
 Jazz Giants '58 (Verve, 1958) with Stan Getz and Gerry Mulligan
 Going for Myself (Verve, 1958) with Lester Young
 The Swinger (Verve, 1958)
 Mr. Swing (Verve, 1958 [1960])
 Harry Edison Swings Buck Clayton (Verve, 1958) with Buck Clayton
 Sweetenings (Roulette, 1958)
 Patented by Edison (Roulette, 1960)
 Together (Roulette, 1961) with Joe Williams
 Jawbreakers (Riverside, 1962) with Eddie "Lockjaw" Davis
 Wanted to Do One Together (Columbia, 1962) with Ben Webster
 "Sweets" for the Sweet (Sue, 1964)
 Sweets for the Sweet Taste of Love (Vee-Jay, 1964)
 When Lights are Low (Liberty, 1966)
 The Trumpet Kings Meet Joe Turner (Pablo, 1974) with Big Joe Turner, Dizzy Gillespie, Roy Eldridge and Clark Terry
 Oscar Peterson and Harry Edison (Pablo, 1974) with Oscar Peterson
 Oscar Peterson and the Trumpet Kings – Jousts (Pablo, 1974) with Oscar Peterson, Dizzy Gillespie, Roy Eldridge and Clark Terry
 Edison's Lights (Pablo, 1976)
 Simply Sweets (Pablo, 1978) with Eddie "Lockjaw" Davis
 Just Friends (Pablo, 1978 [1980]) with John Haley Sims
 Oscar Peterson + Harry Edison + Eddie "Cleanhead" Vinson (Pablo, 1986) with Oscar Peterson and Eddie "Cleanhead" Vinson
 For My Pals (Pablo, 1988)

As sideman

With Count Basie
The Original American Decca Recordings (GRP, 1937–39 [1992])
Memories Ad-Lib (Roulette, 1958)
Breakfast Dance and Barbecue (Roulette, 1959)
Live at the Sands (Before Frank) (Reprise, 1966 [1998])
Hollywood...Basie's Way (Command, 1967)
Basie's Beat (Verve, 1967)
Basie's in the Bag (Brunswick, 1967)
Standing Ovation (Dot, 1969)
With Harry Belafonte
An Evening with Belafonte (RCA Victor, 1957)
With Louie Bellson
Skin Deep (Norgran, 1953) 
Drumorama! (Verve, 1957)
Music, Romance and Especially Love (Verve, 1957)
Louis Bellson at The Flamingo (Verve, 1957)
Thunderbird (Impulse!, 1965)
With Bob Brookmeyer and Zoot Sims
Stretching Out (United Artists, 1958)
With Ray Bryant
Madison Time (Columbia, 1960)
Dancing the Big Twist (Columbia, 1961)
With Hoagy Carmichael
Hoagy Sings Carmichael (Pacific Jazz, 1956)
With Benny Carter
Wonderland (Pablo, 1976 [1986])
Elegy in Blue (MusicMasters, 1994)
With James Carter
Conversin' with the Elders (Atlantic, 1996)
With Dolo Coker
Third Down (Xanadu, 1977)
With Nat King Cole
After Midnight (Capitol, 1957)
With Clifford Coulter
Do It Now! (Impulse!, 1971)
With Bing Crosby and Buddy Bregman
Bing Sings Whilst Bregman Swings (Verve, 1956)
With Sammy Davis Jr
It's All Over but the Swingin' (Decca, 1957)
With Billy Eckstine
Billy's Best! (Mercury, 1958)
With Duke Ellington with Johnny Hodges
Side by Side (Verve, 1959)
Back to Back (Verve, 1959)
With Herb Ellis
Ellis in Wonderland (Verve, 1956)
With Ella Fitzgerald
Ella Fitzgerald Sings the Cole Porter Songbook (1956, Verve)
Get Happy! (1959, Verve)
Hello, Love (1960, Verve)
Whisper Not (1967, Verve)
30 by Ella (1968, Capitol)
Ella Loves Cole (1972, Capitol)
Fine and Mellow (1974, Pablo)
All That Jazz (1989, Pablo)
With Gil Fuller
Gil Fuller & the Monterey Jazz Festival Orchestra featuring Dizzy Gillespie (Pacific Jazz, 1965)
With Dizzy Gillespie
Jazz Recital (Norgran, 1955)
With Jimmy Giuffre
The Jimmy Giuffre Clarinet (Atlantic, 1956)
With Al Grey 
Shades of Grey (Tangerine, 1965)
With Woody Herman
Songs for Hip Lovers (Verve, 1957)
With Billie Holiday
Music for Torching (Norgran, 1955)
Velvet Mood (Clef, 1956)
Lady Sings the Blues (Clef, 1956)
Body and Soul (Verve, 1957)
Songs for Distingué Lovers (Verve, 1957)
All or Nothing at All (Verve, 1958)
With Red Holloway
Live at the Floating Jazz Festival (Chiaroscuro, 1997)
With Milt Jackson
Memphis Jackson (Impulse!, 1969)
With Illinois Jacquet
Illinois Jacquet and His Orchestra (Verve, 1956)
With Budd Johnson
Budd Johnson and the Four Brass Giants (Riverside, 1960)
With Jo Jones
Vamp 'til Ready (Everest, 1960)
The Main Man (Pablo, 1977)
With Quincy Jones
Go West, Man! (ABC, 1957)
The Birth of a Band! (Mercury, 1959)
Quincy Plays for Pussycats (Mercury, 1959-65 [1965])
Walk, Don't Run (Verve, 1966)
With Barney Kessel
To Swing or Not to Swing (Contemporary, 1955)
With Carole King
Rhymes & Reasons (A&M 1972)
With B.B. King
Live at the Apollo (1991) 
With Gene Krupa and Buddy Rich
Krupa and Rich (Clef, 1956)
With Lambert, Hendricks, & Ross
The Hottest New Group in Jazz (Columbia, 1960)
With Modern Jazz Quartet
MJQ & Friends: A 40th Anniversary Celebration (Atlantic, 1994)
With The Pointer Sisters
That's a Plenty (Blue Thumb, 1974)
With Paul Quinichette
Like Basie! (United Artists, 1959)
With Buddy Rich
The Swinging Buddy Rich (Norgran, 1954)
The Wailing Buddy Rich (Norgran, 1955)
This One's for Basie (Verve, 1956)
Buddy Rich Sings Johnny Mercer (Verve, 1956)
Buddy Rich Just Sings (Verve, 1957)
Richcraft (Mercury, 1959)
With Shorty Rogers
Shorty Rogers Courts the Count (RCA Victor, 1954)
Martians Come Back! (Atlantic, 1955 [1956])
Way Up There (Atlantic, 1955 [1957])
Shorty Rogers Plays Richard Rodgers (RCA Victor, 1957)
With Frank Sinatra
Swing Easy! (Capitol, 1954)
In the Wee Small Hours (Capitol, 1955)
Songs for Swingin' Lovers (Capitol, 1956)
Close to You (Capitol, 1957)
A Swingin' Affair (Capitol, 1957)
Only the Lonely (Capitol, 1958)
Nice 'n' Easy (Capitol, 1960)
Sinatra's Swingin' Session!!! (Capitol, 1961)
Sinatra & Company (Reprise, 1971)
Some Nice Things I've Missed (Reprise, 1974)
With Frank Sinatra and Count Basie
It Might as Well Be Swing (Reprise, 1964)
Sinatra at the Sands (Reprise, 1966)
With Mel Tormé
Mel Tormé Live at the Fujitsu–Concord Festival 1990 (Concord, 1990)
Night at the Concord Pavilion (Concord, 1990)
With Sarah Vaughan
Dreamy (Roulette, 1960) 
The Divine One (Roulette, 1961)
With Lester Young
Going for Myself (Recorded 1957–1958)
Laughin' to Keep from Cryin' (1958)
With Nancy Wilson'The Sound of Nancy Wilson (Capitol, 1968)
With Joe WilliamsJoe Williams Live! A Swingin' Night at Birdland (Roulette, 1962)
With Teddy WilsonTeddy Wilson & His All Stars (Chiaroscuro, 1995)
With various artistsJazz at Santa Monica Civic '72 (Pablo, 1973)Jazz at the Philharmonic – Yoyogi National Stadium, Tokyo 1983: Return to Happiness'' (1983, Pablo)

References

External links

Swing trumpeters
Mainstream jazz trumpeters
American jazz trumpeters
American male trumpeters
Count Basie Orchestra members
Sue Records artists
Verve Records artists
Vee-Jay Records artists
Columbia Records artists
1915 births
1999 deaths
Musicians from Columbus, Ohio
20th-century American musicians
Musicians from Louisville, Kentucky
Jazz musicians from Kentucky
American male jazz musicians
Mills Blue Rhythm Band members
Jeter-Pillars Orchestra members
Black & Blue Records artists
20th-century American male musicians
Deaths from prostate cancer
Deaths from cancer in Ohio